"Opp Stoppa" is a song by American rapper YBN Nahmir, first released in June 2019. A sleeper hit, it went viral on TikTok in 2020 and was subsequently re-released on November 24, 2020. Two remixes of the song have since been released in 2021, the first featuring British-American rapper 21 Savage and the second featuring American rapper Lil Eazzyy. The song is also the lead single from YBN Nahmir's debut studio album Visionland (2021).

Background
In an interview with XXL in May 2021, YBN Nahmir said that "Opp Stoppa" means "Something to use against another human being. Someone that's not on your side, I guess. Like, it could be like a gun, a sword, anything." According to him, "Opp Stoppa" revolved around his life but it "really don't connect to me like that anymore." He also shouts out to Chief Keef in the song. Nahmir revealed that the song was originally a freestyle rap and composed in 2018.

The song began trending on TikTok in 2020, eventually becoming the top song of the platform.

Remixes
On January 22, 2021, an official remix of the song featuring 21 Savage was released following its popularity on TikTok. A second remix, which features Lil Eazzyy, was released on April 23, 2021.

Music video
A music video of the original song premiered on June 10, 2019 on the YouTube channel of WorldStarHipHop.

The music video of the remix featuring 21 Savage was released on February 18, 2021. In it, YBN Nahmir throws a party in the front lawn of a house in the hood, with a card tables, box television set and an oven, from which a guest produces baked bird for the group.

Charts

Certifications

References

2019 singles
2019 songs
Atlantic Records singles
YBN Nahmir songs